The terms "semi-opera",  "dramatic[k] opera" and "English opera" were all applied to Restoration entertainments that combined spoken plays with masque-like episodes employing singing and dancing characters. They usually included machines in the manner of the restoration spectacular.   The first examples were the Shakespeare adaptations produced by Thomas Betterton with music by Matthew Locke. After Locke's death, a second flowering produced the semi-operas of Henry Purcell, notably King Arthur and The Fairy-Queen. Semi-opera received a deathblow when the Lord Chamberlain separately licensed plays without music and the new Italian opera.

Semi-operas were performed with singing, speaking and dancing roles. When music was written, it was usually for moments in the play immediately following either love scenes or those concerning the supernatural.

It has been observed that several of Calderón's comedias with music by Juan Hidalgo de Polanco are closer to semi-opera than to the pastoral Zarzuela.

List of English semi-operas
Macbeth (1673) libretto by William Davenant after Shakespeare's Macbeth; music by Matthew Locke
The Tempest, or The Enchanted Island (1674) libretto by Thomas Shadwell after John Dryden and William Davenant's adaptation of Shakespeare's The Tempest; music by Matthew Locke, Giovanni Battista Draghi and Pelham Humfrey
Calisto, or The Chaste Nymph (1675) libretto by John Crowne; music by Nathaniel Staggins
Psyche (1675) libretto by Thomas Shadwell; music by Matthew Locke
Circe (1677) libretto by Charles Davenant; music by John Banister
The Lancashire Witches and Tegue O'Divelly the Irish Priest (1681) libretto by Thomas Shadwell; music by John Eccles
Albion and Albanius (1685) libretto by John Dryden; music by Louis Grabu
Dioclesian (1690) libretto by Thomas Betterton after the play The Prophetess, by John Fletcher and Philip Massinger; music by Henry Purcell
King Arthur (1691) libretto by John Dryden; music by Henry Purcell
The Fairy Queen (1692) libretto by an anonymous author after Shakespeare's A Midsummer Night's Dream; music by Henry Purcell
 Timon of Athens (1694), music by Henry Purcell
Macbeth (1695) libretto by William Davenant after Shakespeare's Macbeth; music by John Eccles and Godfrey Finger
The Indian Queen (1695) libretto adapted version of the play by Sir Robert Howard and John Dryden; music by Henry Purcell, Act V completed by Daniel Purcell
Brutus of Alba (1696) anonymous libretto; music by Daniel Purcell
Cinthia and Endimion, or The Loves of the Deities (1696) libretto by Thomas Durfey; music by Daniel Purcell, Richard Leveridge, Jeremiah Clarke, Henry Purcell and David Underwood
The World in the Moon (1697) libretto by Elkanah Settle; music by Daniel Purcell, Jeremiah Clarke and Henry Purcell
Rinaldo and Armida (1698) libretto by John Dennis; music by John Eccles
The Island Princess (1699) libretto by Peter Motteux, adapted from plays by John Fletcher and Nahum Tate; music by Daniel Purcell, Richard Leveridge and Jeremiah Clarke
The Grove, or Love's Paradise (1700) libretto by John Oldmixon; music by Daniel Purcell
The Mad Lover (1700) libretto by Peter Motteux after the play by John Fletcher; music by John Eccles and Daniel Purcell
Alexander the Great (1701) anonymous libretto after The Rival Queens by Nathaniel Lee; music by Godfrey Finger and Daniel Purcell
The Virgin Prophetess, or The Fate of Troy (1701) libretto by Elkanah Settle; music by Godfrey Finger
The British Enchanters, or No Magic Like Love (1706) libretto by George Granville, Lord Lansdowne; music by John Eccles, Bartholomew Issack and William Corbett
Wonders in the Sun, or The Kingdom of the Birds (1706) libretto by Thomas Durfey; music by John Smith, Samuel Akeroyde, John Eccles, Giovanni Battista Draghi, Lully and Durfey
The Tempest (1712) libretto adapted by Thomas Shadwell from the Dryden-Davenant version of Shakespeare's play; music possibly by John Weldon (long attributed to Henry Purcell)

Notes

References
 Warrack, John and West, Ewan (1992), The Oxford Dictionary of Opera, 782 pages,  
 A Companion to Restoration Drama ed. Susan J. Owen (Blackwell, 2008): chapter by Todd S. Gilman

Italian opera terminology
Opera genres